Lodge Pole is a census-designated place (CDP) in Blaine County, Montana, United States. The population was 265 at the 2010 census. It lies within the Fort Belknap Indian Reservation, near the reservation's southern end.

The nearby community of Hays lies to its west-southwest.

Geography
Lodge Pole is located at  (48.032665, -108.535716).

Demographics

As of the census of 2000, there were 214 people, 59 households, and 48 families residing in the CDP. The population density was 16.0 people per square mile (6.2/km2). There were 69 housing units at an average density of 5.2/sq mi (2.0/km2). The racial makeup of the CDP was 2.34% White, 96.73% Native American, and 0.93% from two or more races.

While Lodge Pole is located on a reservation belonging to both Assiniboine people and Gros Ventre people, the community itself is primarily inhabited by Assiniboine people, while nearby Hays is home to Gros Ventre.

There were 59 households, out of which 50.8% had children under the age of 18 living with them, 42.4% were married couples living together, 25.4% had a female householder with no husband present, and 18.6% were non-families. 16.9% of all households were made up of individuals, and 1.7% had someone living alone who was 65 years of age or older. The average household size was 3.63 and the average family size was 3.90.

In the CDP, the population was spread out, with 45.3% under the age of 18, 5.1% from 18 to 24, 27.1% from 25 to 44, 16.4% from 45 to 64, and 6.1% who were 65 years of age or older. The median age was 24 years. For every 100 females, there were 94.5 males. For every 100 females age 18 and over, there were 91.8 males.

The median income for a household in the CDP was $21,607, and the median income for a family was $22,500. Males had a median income of $21,250 versus $19,375 for females. The per capita income for the CDP was $6,276. About 44.0% of families and 40.9% of the population were below the poverty line, including 42.7% of those under the age of eighteen and 77.8% of those 65 or over.

Education
Lodge Pole has an elementary school. High school is at Hays-Lodgepole High School in nearby Hays.

References

Census-designated places in Blaine County, Montana
Census-designated places in Montana
Fort Belknap Indian Reservation